Talk Is Cheap: Volume 3 is the 13th live spoken word album by Henry Rollins, released on January 13, 2004 on 2.13.61 Records. This show was recorded at the Enmore Theater in Sydney, Australia on April 23, 2003, exactly two years after Talk Is Cheap: Volume 1 (2003) was recorded at the same venue.

Liner Notes
The liner notes to "Talk Is Cheap" Volume III start with Rollins jokingly ask whether Sydney is the only place he makes spoken word recordings.  No, it isn't; but the Enmore Theatre was the location of "Talk Is Cheap" Volume I and his sound recordist makes high-quality recordings there.  Rollins notes that one dollar from each copy bought of "Talk Is Cheap" Volume III will go to Hollygrove Children's Services in Los Angeles, California. Rollins thanks the buyer of the "Talk Is Cheap" series and other CD releases on his 2.13.61 label. Rollins writes, "We have kept the price at ten bucks even in these times of inflation. Why? Because talk is cheap and we're all judged by what we do, not what we say."

Topics
Your Anger Manager
Growing old and staying angry
War's Greatest Hits Vol. 1
Complacent college students
An idiotic letter Henry received
Henry's manager's children
War's Greatest Hits Vol. 2
Iraq War
President George W. Bush
Muhammad Saeed al-Sahhaf – Iraq's overly optimistic Information Minister during the American invasion in 2003
Secretary of Defense Donald Rumsfeld
A Love Story
Clara Harris – a Texas woman who murdered her cheating husband by running him over with a car
The Ramones
The Ramones' effect on Henry's life
The Hollywood Method
Henry's experience as a Hollywood actor and landing a role in the 2003 action–comedy film Bad Boys II

Track listing

Disc 1
 "Your Anger Manager" - 15:13
 "War's Greatest Hits Vol. 1" - 22:53
 "War's Greatest Hits Vol. 2" - 24:08
 "A Love Story" - 16:43

Disc 2
 "The Ramones" - 23:38
 "The Hollywood Method" - 32:22

Credits
Randy Fransz - Recording
Rae Di Leo - Mixing
Dave Chapple - Design
Mike Curtis - Tour Management

References

2004 live albums
Henry Rollins live albums
Live spoken word albums
Live comedy albums
Spoken word albums by American artists
2.13.61 live albums